"Hold Back the River" is a song by the English singer-songwriter James Bay. It was released in the United Kingdom on 17 November 2014 by Republic Records as the second single from Bay's first studio album Chaos and the Calm (2014). The song was written by the Ivor Novello award winner Iain Archer with Bay and produced by Jacquire King. The song peaked at number 2 on the UK Singles Chart. It was nominated for a Grammy Award for Best Rock Song. The song was used in the movie, The Space Between Us.

Music video
A music video to accompany the release of "Hold Back the River" was first released onto YouTube on 24 October 2014 at a total length of four minutes and six seconds.

Chart performance

Weekly charts

Year-end charts

Decade-end charts

Certifications

Release history

References

2014 songs
2014 singles
Irish Singles Chart number-one singles
Song recordings produced by Jacquire King
Songs written by Iain Archer
Songs written by James Bay (singer)
James Bay (singer) songs